Honami (written: ,  or ) is a feminine Japanese given name. Notable people with the name include:

, Japanese long-distance runner
, Japanese weightlifter
, Japanese actress
, Japanese actress
, Japanese volleyball player
Honami Mochizuki (望月 穂波, born 2003), Japanese band drummer

Honami (written:  or ) is also a Japanese surname. The two versions shown here are quite distinct and have different pronunciations: the second is more normally romanized Hon'ami. Notable people with the surname include:

, Japanese craftsman, potter, lacquerer, and calligrapher
, Japanese actress
, Japanese manga artist

Japanese feminine given names
Japanese-language surnames